The uniforms of La Grande Armée, the army of Napoleon I, are described in this article.

Troops of the Line

Infantry of the Line and light infantry

From 1793, the uniforms of the demi-brigades of the line infantry wore the blue "National Uniform" that was to be worn by all soldiers. However, for a long time, line infantry were a mix of the new blue coats worn by the National Guard and the white uniforms of seasoned veterans from the old Royal army. The blue dress was named the "National Uniform" and was worn by all line infantry by 1796. While headgear and details in cut changed, the uniform remained almost completely the same from the beginning of the French Revolution.

The uniform was made of a blue coat, red piped white collar and cuffs, white piped red lapels, blue piped red cuff flaps and shoulder straps, white turnbacks piped red, and brass buttons. Only the brass buttons had the units' identification numbers stamped on them. The lapels were fastened at the upper chest but sloped away below. The hat, a black felt bicorne, was the standard infantry headdress at some of Napoleon's greatest battles. In 1807, the hat was replaced by the shako, which was made of black felt, chevron on the side and visor, a brass diamond shaped plate stamped with the Imperial eagle over the unit's regimental number, white cords, and brass chin scales. Napoleon experimented with a few units by reintroducing white coats with facings of different colours specific to each unit (reminiscent of the old Royal army's coats), but these proved unpopular.

Some units added pompons to the shako as well as plumes. Many units had pompoms with a houpette and the center generally colored white with the company number printed in black or red. The diamond shaped plate with the regimental was most common, but some units had the shape of an eagle or the rising sun.

In 1812, the cut of the coat was changed into a coatee that included short tails, a blue crowned N on the turnbacks, and the lapels fastened down to the waist and cut square. The waistcoat was made higher and was therefore not visible. The black gaiters came up to below the knees. The plate on the shako was now a crowned eagle over a semicircle with the regimental number inscribed on it.

Infantrymen carried the 1777 Charleville musket that had a bayonet with a 406 mm (16 inch) blade. The black leather M. 1801 cartridge box held 35 rounds of ammunition and was carried by a white buff shoulder belt; that for fusiliers had a frog for the bayonet. The cartridge box flap generally had a white linen cover and the forage cap was rolled under the box with red tassel hanging out. The M. 1801 knapsack was made of cow hide with two straps (later three straps) to hold the rolled greatcoat on the top.

The Grenadiers' uniform was almost exactly the same as that of the fusiliers, except for red epaulettes and grenades worn on the turnbacks. They wore a bearskin cap with a brass plate stamped with a flaming grenade on the front, red cords and plume, and a red back patch with a white cross. The epaulettes broadened their shoulders and the tall bearskins made them look even taller. Moustaches were also mandatory. There were several variations that included a blue and red quartered back, white cords and a peak. This variation's headdress was a bicorne with a red pompom.

Voltigeurs wore a yellow-buff collar, green epaulettes with a yellow crescent, and yellow-buff bugle horns on the turnbacks. From 1804, they wore shakos, but some had bicorne hats with green pompoms and a yellow brush. By 1807, all Voltigeurs had a shako which could be plain black, and have a yellow top or bottom band, or have yellow chevrons, green cords, and an all-green plume or a green plume with a yellow tip.

Every regiment had a squad of Sappers who were generally dressed as grenadiers with red epaulettes and a cross axes badge on the upper sleeves, a bearskin cap with red cords and feather but no plate. They were equipped with a long leather apron, white gauntlet gloves, and an axe with a brass mounted handle. It was customary for sappers to grow beards.

Officers wore the same uniform as their men but it was of better quality. Their brass buttons were gilt, they had epaulettes according to their rank, and, on duty, they had a gilt gorget with a silver badge, generally a crowned eagle. Their turnback ornaments were identical to those of other ranks but in gold, while the battalion staff had grenades. Instead of gaiters, they wore black boots. Officers' bicornes had gold cockade loops and sometimes gold tassels at the end. Bearskin caps had gold cords, and a plate and cross on the back patch. Shakos had gilt plates and chin scales, gold bands and sometimes chevrons. Plumes and pompons were colored in the company's color or white if on regimental staff. Drummers had basically the same uniform as their company with tricolor, yellow, or orange lace edgings, red wings edged with lace, and a bass drum with medium blue hoops and white belts.

Heavy Cavalry

Carabiniers

The corps of Carabiniers was a group of heavy cavalry originally created by Louis XIV. From 1791 to 1809, their uniforms consisted of a blue coat with a blue piped red collar, red cuffs, lapels and turnbacks with white grenades, red epaulettes with edged white straps, red cuff flaps for the 1st Regiment, blue piped red for the 2nd; pewter buttons, a white waistcoat, buff breeches, high boots, a black bearskin cap, white cords, a red patch with a white cross, a red plume, metal white chin scales from 1809, yellow-buff edged white belts, white gauntlet gloves, blue cloaks, and white sheepskin edged red. They wore white long gaiters for service on foot and blue overalls for undress. Carabiniers were armed with a dragoon musket with a bayonet and sword. The regiments rode black horses while trumpeters rode greys.

Trumpeters wore reversed colors, a red coat with a red collar, silver cuffs edged blue, lapels and turnbacks, silver and blue epaulettes, as well as other items described above.

In 1809, their uniforms were completely modified and saw the introduction of helmets and cuirasses. They wore an all-white uniform with light blue facings and red épaulettes. They wore a brass cuirass and a brass helmet with a red woolen crest named chenille (caterpillar, in French), a sealskin turban, black leather visor and brass chin scales.

Cuirassiers

The Cuirassier's uniform consisted of a blue coat with long tails until 1804, when all Cuirassier regiments began to wear cuirasses and helmets. The helmet was made of polished steel with brass comb, a black mane, a black cow-hide turban, black visor edged with brass, a red plume in a small brass socket on the left side, and brass chin scales. Senior officers had white plumes and gilded brass. The cuirass had front and back plates made of polished steel and had leather straps with brass scales, brass studs and fittings and the cuirass lining was edged with white in all regiments. Cuirassiers were armed with a straight-bladed cavalry sword, carbine and a pistol from 1806.

The uniform of the trumpeters from 1804 consisted of a helmet with a red or white mane, a blue single-breasted coatee with cuffs and a collar edged with silver or white lace, and white lace at buttonholes on the front. Before 1810, the trumpeters of the 1st and 4th trumpeters had a white helmet mane, a red plume, a red coatee, red collar and cuffs edged silver, white turnbacks with red grenades, seven laces on the chests, and red epaulettes. The 6th regiment in circa 1810–1812 wore a white helmet mane and red plume, a blue coatee with orange edged silver cuffs and collar, red epaulettes with a white crescent, and orange laces on the chest. The 7th regiment wore a yellow coatee and the 8th regiment wore an orange one. The 13th regiment, in 1812, wore a white helmet mane, a wine red coatee with five white laces in front. They did not wear the cuirass and were mounted on white and gray horses.

Line cavalry

Dragoons

The uniform of the Dragoon consisted of a green coat with turnbacks and lapels of the regimental facing color, and the collar, cuffs, cuff flaps, and piping edging the facings either of the facings color or green depending on the regiment, green shoulder straps piped with the facing color, yet many regiments wore white epaulettes instead, turnbacks with green grenades, pewter buttons, a white waistcoat and breeches, black long boots, a brass helmet with a brass crest, a black helmet mane, a sealskin turban, black leather visor, the plume varied (see below), brass chin scales, a bearskin cap with a red plume, red and white cords, a red back panel with a white cross, red epaulettes for elite companies, a green surtout and green stable jacket, a green forage cap piped the facing color, white lace and grenade, white duck trousers, grey overalls with buttons on the side, white gauntlet gloves, an off-white cloak, and green housing edged white with white number. Sappers wore bearskin caps with red cords, plumes, and a back panel with a white cross, red epaulettes, red crossed axes on the upper sleeves, and a white or buff apron.

From February 1812, the coatee remained the same colour while plumes were no longer issued for helmets. Instead, pompoms coloured red, sky blue, orange, and violet were issued for the first company of each squadron. These same colors were used for the white centre of the second companies. They were armed with a Dragoon musket with a bayonet and a sword.

Officers wore silver buttons and lace, gilded brass on their helmets, a turban of leopard fur (usually an imitation) that often went over the visor, and white plumes for the senior officers.

Trumpeters wore reversed colors, facing sometimes edged with white lace, a coat often single-breasted with white buttonholes in front, no cuff flaps, white epaulettes, and a white of red mane on the helmet. The same dress was used for the Foot Dragoons but with brass drums with blue hoops instead of trumpets. They rode white and grey horses.

Chevau-legers lanciers 

The uniform of the light cavalry (or chevau-legers) of the line consisted of a green coat with turnbacks and lapels of the regimental facing color, which could be crimson, red, blue, pink or yellow. The collar and cuffs were of the facings color, the green shoulder straps and the breeches were piped with the facing color. The uniform comprised pewter buttons, black boots, a brass helmet with a brass crest supporting a woolen crest named chenille (caterpillar, in French), a sealskin turban, black leather visor, brass chin scales and red epaulettes for elite companies.

Light cavalry

Hussars

The uniform of the Napoleonic hussars included the pelisse: a short fur edged jacket which was often worn slung over one shoulder in the style of a cape, and was fastened with a cord. This garment was extensively adorned with braiding (often gold or silver for officers) and several rows of multiple buttons. Under it was worn the dolman or tunic which was also decorated in braid. On active service the hussar normally wore reinforced breeches which had leather on the inside of the leg to prevent them from wearing due to the extensive riding in the saddle. On the outside of such breeches, running up the outside was a row of buttons, and sometimes a stripe in a different colour. A shako or fur busby was worn as headwear. The colours of dolman, pelisse and breeches varied greatly by regiment, even within the same army. The French hussar of the Napoleonic period was armed with a brass hilted sabre and sometimes with a brace of pistols, although these were often unavailable.

Horse Chasseurs

Horse chasseurs colour scheme:

Line artillery

Foot artillery 
The uniform of the Foot artillery gunners of the line was made of a blue coat, red cuffs, red lapels, blue piped red cuff flaps, red épaulettes and brass buttons. Their breeches were blue with black (winter) or white (summer) gaiters. They wore a shako with a red plume.

Horse artillery 
The uniform of the Horse artillery of the line was made of a hussar-style blue coat with red braids, red cuffs and brass buttons. They wore blue piped red hussar-style breeches, black hussar boots and a black shako with red cords and plume. Troopers of the Horse Artillery could wear a simplified version that was very similar to that of the Foot.

Line Train 
The uniform of the soldiers of the train was made of a light blue-grey coat and buff breeches. The facings were dark blue for the artillery train or brown for the baggage train. Soldiers of the train wore a shako with a light blue-grey or red plume (or pompons). Their buttons and other metallic elements were silver.

Troops of the Imperial Guard

Infantry of the Imperial Guard

Grenadiers of the Old Guard 
The uniform of the Grenadiers of the Imperial Guard was very similar to that of the Grenadier of the line : Both were made of a blue coat, red piped white cuffs, white piped red lapels, blue piped red cuff flaps, red epaulettes and brass buttons. The most notable difference was the headgear : Grenadiers of the Guard wore a tall bearskin cap with a brass plate stamped with the Imperial eagle, with white cords and red plume, and a red patch with a golden grenade on the top of the bearskin. Other differences include the blue collar of the Guard Grenadiers (instead of red pipped white collar for Line grenadiers) and longer red turnbacks with gold grenades (instead of white turnbacks piped red with red grenades).

Chasseurs à pied of the Old Guard

The uniform was that of the Grenadiers of the Old Guard, differences being a plate less bearskin, a green and red plume and epaulettes. The lapels had notable differences as well. The embroideries on the turnbacks were a combination of a bugle and a grenade to signify Chasseurs of the Old Guard. The cuffs were of light infantry design.

Fusiliers-Chasseurs of the Middle Guard 

The uniform of the Fusiliers-Chasseurs was that of the Chasseurs a pied from the Old Guard. The only change was the headgear, black shako with imperial eagle, white cord and brass chin straps, with tricolor cockade atop and green and red plume.

Voltigeurs and Tirailleurs of the Young Guard

Marines

Raised from sailors of the French navy who had distinguished themselves, the battalion of Marins wore a distinctive, elaborate uniform resembling that of the hussars. Their officers bore titles of rank derived from their seagoing compatriots, and the overall commander of the marines bore the rank of capitaine de vaisseau. Their duties including manning boats and other watercraft used by the Emperor. The Marines of the Imperial Guard wore blue vest and trousers piped aurore (orange-gold). They had aurore hussar-style braids on their tunic, gold epaulettes and red cuffs. Their shako was black piped aurore with a red plume.

Cavalry of the Imperial Guard

Horse grenadiers

Empress dragoons 

The Dragoon Guards wore green coats with white lapels and red turnbacks. They also wore aurore (light orange) aiguillettes and epaulettes. They wore brass helmets with a long black mane, a simulated leopard fur turban and a red plume (white plume for the highest officers). They rode chestnut horses.

The trumpeters wore a light blue tunic with white lappels and crimson turnbacks and collar. The mane on their helmets was white and the plume was light blue. They wore grey horses. They also had a white uniform for parade, consisting of a white coat with light blue lappels and collar lined with gold.

Chasseurs à Cheval de la Garde Impériale 

The uniform of the Horse chasseurs of the Guards was very similar to the hussar uniform, comprising pelisse and Busby, but the unvariating color of the dolman and breeches was green with a collar piped of gold. Their pelisses and cuffs were red pipped with gold. The plume of their busby was red-over-green.

It was the Chasseurs that usually provided personal escort to Napoleon, and he often wore the non-Hussar uniform of a colonel of their regiment in recognition of this service.

Lancers (or chevaux-légers)

Mamelukes 
The Mamelukes wore the following uniforms:

Before 1804: The only "uniform" part was the green  (hat), white turban, and red saroual (baggy trousers), all to be worn with a loose shirt and a vest. Boots were of yellow, red, or tan soft leather. Weapons consisted of an "Oriental" scimitar, a brace of pistols in a holder decorated with a brass crescent and star, and a dagger.

After 1804: The  became red with a brass crescent and star, and the shirt was closed and had a collar. The main change was the addition of a "regulation" chasseur-style saddle cloth and roll, imperial green in color, piped red, with a red and white fringe. The saddle and harness remained Arabic in style. The undress uniform was as for the Chasseurs-à-Cheval of the Guard, but of a dark blue cloth.

Elite Gendarmes

The Gendarmes d'élite wore a blue coat with red lappels, cuffs and turnbacks. The collar and cuff flaps were red piped blue. They wore buff breeches, waistcoat and gloves. They had white aiguillettes and clover-shaped epaulettes. They wore a tall bearskin cap with a visor, topped by a red round cloth patch nicknamed cul-de-singe ("monkey bottom") with a white grenade embroidered on it. They rode black horses.

The trumpeter wore the same uniform bu with reversed colours. They rode grey horses.

In 1815, crested helmets with black manes (red for trumpeters) were introduced but not completed, so the Gendarmes d'élite fought their last campaign with mixed headgears.

Artillery of the Imperial Guard

Others

Insignia

Ranks

{| class="wikitable"
! Grande Armée rank !! Modern U.S./U.K./NATO equivalent!!Line Insignia  Left/Right Shoulder  !!Hussar Insignia*  **
|-
|Marshal of the Empire||Field marshal||    ||
|-
|Général d'armée, (not a rank, an appointment) || General||  ||
|-
|Général de corps d'armée, (not a rank, an appointment) || Lieutenant general||  ||
|-
|Général de division, Lieutenant général (ancien régime rank reintroduced in 1814) || Major General|| ||
|-
|Général de brigade, Maréchal de camp (equivalent to Major général.  ancien régime rank reintroduced in 1814) || Brigadier General||  ||
|-
|Adjudant-commandant || Staff Colonel||||
|-
|Colonel || Colonel|||| 
|-
|Colonel en second|| Senior lieutenant colonel||  ||
|-
|Major || Lieutenant Colonel||  || 
|-
|Major en second || Senior Major|| ||
|-
|Chef de bataillon or Chef d'escadron ||Major|| || 
|-
|Capitaine adjutant-major || Staff Captain ||  ||
|-
|Capitaine || Captain||||
|-
|Lieutenant || First Lieutenant|| Cavalry:||
|-
|Sous-lieutenant || Second Lieutenant||    Cavalry:||
|-
| colspan=2 | Non-commissioned officers
|-
|Adjudant sous-officier || Chief Warrant Officer|| || 
|-
|Adjudant-Chef || Warrant Officer||  ||
|-
|Adjudant || Sergeant-Major
|-
|Sergent-Major or Maréchal des logis Chef || First sergeant ||    || 
|-
|Sergent or Maréchal des Logis || Sergeant ||    || 
|-
|Caporal-Fourrier or Brigadier-Fourrier || Company clerk/supply Sergeant ||   || 
|-
|Caporal or Brigadier (Cavalry, Horse Artillery and Gendarmerie) || Corporal || || 
|-
|Soldat or Cavalier(Cavalry) or Canonnier(Artillery)|| Private or UK equivalent||  ||
|}
 Hussar insignia was represented with elaborate curved embroidered chevrons in gold lace on the lower sleeve of the wearer's coat and pelisse extending from the cuff to the elbow of the wearer.  Officer's chevrons had the point facing up.  Warrant officers and NCOs were the same, but less elaborate.  
 The Hussar system later became the insignia of French officers from the rank of Colonel to below.

Officers
High-ranking officers wore customized uniforms with various embellishments in embroideries.

The field officers generally wore a gorget and epaulettes which could be in silver or gold, depending on the corps but according to the buttons. They also wore a plume or a pompon of different colours on their headgear.
Colonel: two epaulettes with thick fringes + white plume
Colonel en second:  two epaulettes with thick fringes and a red stripe in the middile + white plume
Major: two epaulettes with thick fringes and silver shoulder straps (or in gold if the buttons were silver) + red and white plume
Major en second: two epaulettes with thick fringes and silver shoulder straps (or in gold if the buttons were silver) and a red stripe in the middle + red and white plume
Chef de Bataillon (infantry) or Chef de Brigade (cavalry) : the left epaulette with thick fringes and the right epaulette without fringes + red plume
Capitaine-adjudant-major: the right epaulette with thin fringes and the left epaulette without fringes + white pompon
Capitaine: the left epaulette with thin fringes and the right epaulette without fringes + pompon of the company colour 
Lieutenant: the left epaulette with thin fringes and the right epaulette without fringes + one red stripe along each stap + pompon of the company colour 
Sous-lieutenant: the left epaulette with thin fringes and the right epaulette without fringes + two red stripes along each strap + pompon of the company colour

Sous-officiers (non-commissioned officers)
The NCO wore coloured stripes on both lower sleeves if the cuffs were horizontal, or chevrons if the cuffs were pointy. Except for the adjudant, the NCO did not wear epaulettes, except if they were part of an élite régiment.

Adjudant: the left epaulette with thin fringes and the right epaulette without fringes + red shoulder straps with two gold (or silver) stripes along each strap
Sergent-major (infantry) or Maréchal des logis (cavalry): two gold (or silver) stripes (or chevrons)
Sergent (infantry) or Maréchal des logis (cavalry): one gold (or silver) stripe (or chevron)
Caporal-fourrier (infantry) or brigadier-fourrier (cavalry): two yellow stripes (or chevrons) + one gold (or siler) stripe on the upper left sleeve
Caporal (infantry) or brigadier (cavalry): two yellow stripes (or chevrons)
Soldat (infantry) or cavalier (cavalry): No insignia

Galons d'ancienneté

The Galons d'ancienneté ("Veteran's Braid") were long service awards in the form of cloth braid chevrons (nicknamed Brisques''', or "Breaks") worn on the upper left sleeve to indicate seniority. Veteran troops that had earned them were nicknamed Briscards ("One Who Has Breaks").
1 Chevron = 10–15 Years service.    
2 Chevrons = 15–20 Years service.
3 Chevrons = 20–25 Years of service.
Some soldiers in the Guard were awarded a fourth chevron (more than 30 years of service), but they were very few.

Speciality insignia

Some soldiers wore speciality insignia such as horseshoes for farriers or two crossed axes for sappers

Musicians

In Ancien Régime France, drummers and trumpeters wore the royal livery which consisted of a blue coat with red and white stripes. When France became a republic, musicians wore various types of uniforms to distinguish them from other soldiers depending on each colonel's imagination. The most common way to distinguish them was to reverse the colours of the uniform (if the standard uniform consisted of a green coat and yellow facings, the musician's uniform would be a yellow coat and green facings). From 1812 onwards, Napoleon introduced the Imperial livery which consisted of a green coat with yellow stripes bearing alternatively the letter "N" (for Napoleon) and the Imperial eagle.

 Bibliography 
Chartrand, René (1996) [2000]. Napoleonic Wars: Napoleon's Army. Brassey'sFrench, Prussian and Anglo-allies uniforms during the Battle of Waterloo: Mont-Saint-Jean (FR)
Rousselot, Lucien. Napoleon's Army 1790–1815. Casemate, 2010.
Bucquoy, E. L. Les Uniformes de Premier Empire. (Complete 10 Volume set). Paris: Grancher, 1977–1985. Vol. 1. La Garde Imperiale, Troupes a Pied. (Tome I); Vol. 2. La Garde Imperiale, Troupes a Cheval. (Tome II); Vol. 3. Les Cuirassiers; Vol. 4. L'Infanterie; Vol. 5. La Cavalerie Legere; Vol. 6. Dragons et Guides; Vol. 7. Etat-major et Service de Sante; Vol. 8. Gardes d'Honneur et Troupes Etrangeres; Vol. 9. La Maison de l'Empereur; Vol. 10. Fanfares et Musiques des troupes a Cheval 1640–1940. (Color illustrations of uniforms by Benigni, Boisselier, Feirst, Giffard, Hilpert, Huen, Job, Lapeyre, Laroux, Rene Louis, Rousseltot, Toussaint.)
Haythornthwaite, Philip & Cassin-Scott. Uniforms of the Napoleonic Wars in Colour 1796 – 1814. Blandford, 1973.
Haythornthwaite, Philip & Chappell, Michael. Uniforms of 1812: Napoleon's Retreat from Moscow. Blandford, 1982.
Haythornthwaite, Philip. Uniforms of Waterloo in Color, 16–18 June 1815. Blandford, 1974.
Elting, John; Knotel, Herbert (illus.). Napoleonic Uniforms. Volumes I, II, III & IV. Macmillan, 1993 & Emperor's Press, 2000.
Bourgeot, Vincent & Pigeard, Alain. Encyclopedie des Uniformes Napoleoniens 1800–1815. Quatuor, 2003. 
Charmy. Splendeur des Uniformes de Napoleon: La Garde Imperiale a Cheval. Charles Herissey, 2003.
Charmy. Splendeur des Uniformes de Napoleon: Infanterie Regiments Etrangers. Charles Herissey, 2004.
Boisselier, Henry & Martin, Yves. La Garde Imperiale et ses Uniformes''. Le Livre chez vous, 2008. (623p. Color uniform plates by Boisselier. Based on the Anne S. K. Brown uniform print collection at Brown University. Very Oversize.)

References

French military uniforms
La Grande Armée